Daddy Lumba (born 29 September 1964) is a Ghanaian singer-songwriter and musician and has about 34 albums to his name. Lumba was born Charles Kwadwo Fosuh in a village called Nsuta Amangoase in the Sekyere Central District, near Mampong in the Ashanti Region. He is widely regarded as the greatest Ghanaian musician of all time.

His father, Owoahene Kwadwo Fosuh, a teacher, died when Lumba was only a child. His mother, Comfort Gyamfi, popularly known as Ama Saah, was also a teacher. She died in 2001 in Kumasi. Her death was a devastating blow to Lumba as she was literally everything to him. Many of Daddy Lumba's songs, including "Anidasoɔ Wɔhɔ Ma Obiara", "Ohia Asɛm", "Ɛmmere Pa Bɛba", "Agya Bi Wua Agya Bi Tease", were dedicated to her.

He is married with children.

Career
Daddy Lumba's music career started at the age of 16. He was the leader of Juaben Senior High School choir from 1983 to 1984 academic year where Christabel was the music teacher and he completed in 1985. In Juaben SHS, Lumba formed the Lumba Brothers group with his friends Yaw and Kwabena and girlfriend, Theresa Abebrese.

After school, with the help of his girlfriend Theresa, Lumba travelled to Germany to seek greener pastures.

In Germany, he met Ernest Nana Acheampong. Nana had already formed a group called talking dreams with a white man. The only thing Lumba knew at the time was gospel music, and he has credited Nana Acheampong for introducing him to highlife music.

They formed another group called Lumba Brothers, the same name as his first group when he was in Juaben SHS.

The pair planned releasing an album in 1986 but due to financial constrains, the album was released in 1989 with the help of Lumba's wife, Akosua Serwaa, who produced the album.  The title of the album is Yɛɛyɛ Aka Akwantuo Mu.

Daddy Lumba, in all, has released 33 albums. The albums include critically acclaimed ones such as Aben Wɔha, Awosuɔ, Obi Ate Me So Buɔ, Sika Asɛm and Ebi Se Ɛyɛ Aduro.

He is currently gearing up for his 34th album, titled Nnipa Fon Na Ɛka Nsɛm Fon.

He has been consistent with the release of multiple-hit albums since then and has established himself as one of Ghana's most popular singers of the Highlife genre.

He introduced a future love song master, Ofori Amponsah, through his blockbuster hit album Woho Kyere (1999). Daddy Lumba's pairing in 1999 with the rising star produced five hits and shot Ofori Amponsah into the limelight. Altogether he has sprung the careers of 13 different Ghanaian musicians.

In 1999, he won three awards including Best Album, Artist of the Year and the Most popular Song of the Year at the Ghana Music Awards. Before the year 2002, Daddy Lumba came out every year with a hit album.

His solo career has not been devoid of controversy; one moment he would release a gospel album and the next he would shock people with his provocative lyrics and music videos. He has also faced accusations of skin bleaching. He has however denied bleaching his skin.

He owns his own studio where he does all his work and also owns machines for mastering, cassette duplication, loading, printing and shrink wrapping exclusively for his works. His music has evolved over the years to reflect the changes in taste and demands for music; he can currently be described as a contemporary highlife artist. Daddy Lumba has won several Ghana Music Awards and other excellence awards and continue to appeal to the young and old.

Most of his songs were backed by female singer Yvonne Ohene Djan, professionally known as SHE.

On December 23, 2022, Daddy Lumba released his long-awaited single, 'Ofon Na Edi Asem Fo'.

Radio station
In September 2022, Daddy Lumba opened DLFM (106.9 MHz), a radio station broadcasting in Twi in the Accra area.

Selected discography
 Yereye Aka Akwantuo Mu (with Nana Acheampong) (1989)
 Obi Ate Meso Bo (1990)
 Sika Asem (1991)
 Vida with Felix Owusu (1993)
 The Very Best Of Daddy Lumba Vol. 1 (1994)
 Mesom Jesus (1995)
 Playboy (1995)
 Biribi gyegye wo (1995)
 Hwan na Otene with Akua Serwaa Bonsu (1996)
 Sesee Wo Se (1997)
 Aben waha (1998)
 Woho kyere with Ofori Amponsah (1999)
 Ebi se ɛyɛ aduro  (1999)
 Back for Good (1999)
 Aseɛ ho (with Borax) (2000)
 Mato Odo mu (2000)
 Poison (2001)
 Mɛma afa wo tirim (2002)
 Bubra (2003)
 Pa Ntoma (with Borax) (2004)
 Ahenfo Kyinye with Pat Thomas (2004)
 Area Boy (2005)
 Give peace a chance (2005)
 Tokrom (2006)
 Agenda (2007)
 Sika (2008)
 Aware Pa Ye Anibre (2009)
 Kohye Po (2011)
 Awoso (2014)
 Ye Nea Woho Beto Wo (2014)
 Hosanna with Great Ampong (2015)
 Enko den (2016)

Awards 

 On 18 August 2018, he was acknowledged with an "Icon/Legend of Entertainment" award at the Exclusive Men of the Year Africa Awards (EMY Award).
 2000 Ghana Music Awards - Artist of the Year, Best Album of the Year, Most Popular Song of the Year
 2003 Ghana Music Awards - Contemporary Highlife Artist, Contemporary Highlife Song, Contemporary Highlife Album

External links 
 Daddy Lumba on Facebook

References

Ghanaian highlife musicians
Living people
1964 births
20th-century Ghanaian male singers
21st-century Ghanaian male singers